Miraani Dam.   Dasht River south of the Central Makran Range in Kech District in Balochistan province of Pakistan. Its  reservoir is fed by the Kech River and the Nihing River. Mirani Dam was completed in July 2006 and began impounding the Dasht River in August 2006.

History and construction
The feasibility report of the Mirani dam project was first completed in 1956. The project then went into the back screen due to the other major events of the time. 45 years passed like that and then in the wake of Gwadar Port development  Mirani Dam was commissioned by Pakistan's Water and Power Development Authority (WAPDA) in 2001 to provide water for Gwadar city. The ceremonial ground breaking was performed by then President of Pakistan, General Pervez Musharraf, in August 2001. The project was done on EPC basis by Descon Engineering Limited.

Commencement of work began in June 2002 and the project was completed in June 2007. Impounding of reservoir started in July 2006 and was inaugurated by then President of Pakistan Gen. Pervez Musharraf on 16 November 2006.

Construction of t-hours and, at its peak, 1,550 people were employed for its construction, mostly from Kech and Gwadar districts.  of land was acquired for the project.

During Cyclone Yemyin in June 2007, backflowing water from Mirani Dam in the Nihing and Kech rivers resulted in a large-scale disaster, affected several thousand households in the upstream areas of Nasirabad, Kallatuk, and Nodiz.

Geography and hydrology
The Central Makran Range are located to the north of the dam site. Both Kech and Nihing are seasonal streams which flow during summer from rainfall.

Structure and purpose

Kech Valley consists of cultivable soil upon which agriculture activity could be carried out if a constant water supply is ensured. The primary purpose of Mirani Dam was to store water from the three rivers during the summer season and during floods so that water could be available for irrigation purposes throughout the year in order to bring  of hitherto uncultivated land in Kech Valley under cultivation. The secondary purpose of Mirani Dam is to ensure a constant supply of clean drinking water to the towns of Turbat and Gwadar throughout the year.

Reservoir: 
 Gross Storage: .
 Live Storage: .
 Average Annual Releases: .

Dam:
 Type: Concrete-faced rock-filled
 Height: 
 Length at Crest: 
 Top Width: 

Spillway:
 Type: Overflow
 Clear Waterway: 
 Designed Capacity: 
 Maximum Capacity:   

Outlet:
 Tunnel Diameter: 
 Capacity:  

Irrigation System Command Area & Capacity:
 Irrigation System: Gravity, Lined Channels
 Right Bank Canal:  & 
 Left Bank Canal:  & 
 Total:  &

Gallery

Issues
The local communities have staged protests, hunger-strikes, and people's tribunal to demand compensation in lieu of damages from the government authorities.

Mirani Dam Flooding
On the night between June 26 & 27, 2007 the backflow water from Mirani dam inundated upstream areas of Nasirabad, Nodez, and Kallatuk destroying several thousand houses, date trees, and indigenous underground irrigation channels. The damage was so extensive that the current Chief Minister of Baluchistan province, Dr. Abdul Malik Baloch who was a Senator at the time, termed the Dam as a "mega-disaster" and calling into question all the government assessments and forecasts about its utility. Local activists have been since then demanding the relevant authorities including WAPDA, the Planning Commission of Pakistan, and the Provincial government to pay compensation for their losses. Their specific demands include compensation of damages to houses and date trees for up to 271.2 Average Mean Sea Level (AMSL),. While the government has acknowledged the claim by local communities 8 years after the disaster, the compensation is yet to be paid.

See also
 List of dams and reservoirs in Pakistan

References

External links
 Mirani Dam Project Brief
 UNOSAT reservoir map

Dams in Balochistan, Pakistan
Kech District
Concrete-face rock-fill dams
Dams completed in 2006